Straiton is a village on the River Girvan in South Ayrshire in Scotland, mainly built in the 18th century, but with some recent housing.

It was the main location for the film The Match, where two rival pubs played against each other in an annual football match as a challenge. However, since the village has only one pub, a house was used as a pub for filming.

It lies in the hills between Kirkmichael, Dalmellington, Crosshill, and Maybole.

Local attractions include:
 Blairquhan Castle, open to visitors in spring and summer, was the historic home of the Hunter-Blair Baronets.
 Tairlaw Linn, a local waterfall.

Community public toilets 
The village's public toilets were closed by South Ayrshire Council in 2008 and subsequently re-opened under the management of the village community.  Donations are invited to cover the £3,500 annual running costs.

External links
 

Villages in Carrick, Scotland